Peter Clark may refer to:

 Peter Clark (footballer, born 1979), retired English professional footballer
 Peter Clark (footballer, born 1938) (1938–2008), English footballer
 Peter Clark (historian) (born 1944), British historian
 Peter Clark (athlete) (born 1933), British long-distance runner
 Peter D. Clark (politician) (born 1938), Canadian politician
 Peter D. Clark (writer), Canadian writer, storyteller and folklore collector
 Peter H. Clark (1829–1925), American abolitionist and socialist 
 Peter Clark (translator), translator of Arabic literature and trustee for the International Prize for Arabic Fiction
 Pete Clark (American football), see Dallas Cowboys draft history

See also
 Peter Clarke (disambiguation)